Seyyedabad (also Romanized as Seyyedābād; also known as Sa‘īdābād and Saiyidābād) is a village in Bampur-e Gharbi Rural District, in the Central District of Bampur County, Sistan and Baluchestan Province, Iran. At the 2006 census, its population was 1,153, in 244 families.

References 

Populated places in Bampur County